, also known as , is a Buddhist temple in Asuka, Nara. Asuka-dera is regarded as one of the oldest temples in Japan.

Temple complex

A number of records refer to the origin of the temple, such as the Nihongi and Fusō-ryakuki. The original buildings of what was then called Hōkō-ji were constructed in 588, shortly after the introduction of Buddhism to Japan, under the orders of Soga no Umako. The temple was built using the guidance of masters and artisans from the ancient Korean kingdom of Baekje.

Following the transfer of the capital from Asuka to Heijō-kyō (now Nara city), the buildings of Asuka-dera were also removed from the original site in Asuka to Nara in 718 CE, and developed into a huge temple under the name of Gangō-ji. The original site of Hōkō-ji was also maintained as a temple, which survives into modern times.

The main object of worship at Asuka-dera is the bronze Great Buddha, which said to have been made by Kuratsukuri no Tori in the early seventh century. The statue is designated as an Important Cultural Property.

See also 
 Gangō-ji
Historical Sites of Prince Shōtoku
 For an explanation of terms concerning Japanese Buddhism, Japanese Buddhist art, and Japanese Buddhist temple architecture, see the Glossary of Japanese Buddhism.

References

Bibliography
 Aston, William G. (2005). Nihongi: Chronicles of Japan from the Earliest Times to A.D. 697. Tokyo: Charles E. Tuttle Company.  
 Brown, Delmer M. and Ichirō Ishida, eds. (1979). [ Jien, c. 1220], Gukanshō (The Future and the Past, a translation and study of the Gukanshō, an interpretative history of Japan written in 1219). Berkeley: University of California Press.  
 Martin, John H. and Phyllis G. Martin. (1993).  Nara: A Cultural Guide to Japan's Ancient Capital. Tokyo: Tuttle Publishing. 
 Shimura, Izuru. (1998). Kōjien, 5th edition. Tokyo: Iwanami Shoten.  (cloth)
 Ponsonby-Fane, Richard Arthur Brabazon. (1959).  The Imperial House of Japan. Kyoto: Ponsonby Memorial Society. OCLC 194887
 Titsingh, Isaac, ed. (1834). [Siyun-sai Rin-siyo/Hayashi Gahō, 1652], Nipon o daï itsi ran; ou,  Annales des empereurs du Japon.  Paris: Oriental Translation Fund of Great Britain and Ireland.
 Varley, H. Paul , ed. (1980). [ Kitabatake Chikafusa, 1359], Jinnō Shōtōki ("A Chronicle of Gods and Sovereigns: Jinnō Shōtōki of Kitabatake Chikafusa" translated by H. Paul Varley). New York: Columbia University Press.

External links

 Asuka Historical Museum website
 Gango-ji as world heritage site (JAL)
 Gango-ji in context of Nara tourism

Buddhist temples in Nara Prefecture
Historic Sites of Japan
Buddhist archaeological sites in Japan
Buddhist relics
Buddhism in the Asuka period